Valeriu Nicolaevici Ciupercă (born 12 June 1992) is a Moldovan-born Russian professional footballer who plays as a midfielder.

Career
He made his Russian Premier League debut for FC Krasnodar on 13 May 2012 in a game against PFC Spartak Nalchik.

On 2 July 2014, Ciupercă signed a three-year contract with Anzhi Makhachkala.

On 27 May 2016, he scored the decisive goal for FC Tom Tomsk in their promotion play-offs second-leg 2-0 victory against FC Kuban Krasnodar, securing Tom's promotion to the Russian Football Premier League.

On 10 January 2018, Ciupercă signed a two-and-a-half-year contract with FC Rostov. He was released from his Rostov contract by mutual consent on 4 July 2018.

On 13 July 2018, he signed a two-year contract with FC Tambov.

On 2 March 2021, Astana announced the signing of Ciupercă, with Ciupercă leaving Astana by mutual agreement on 30 December 2021.

On 17 March 2022, Ciupercă signed for Kuban Krasnodar in the Russian Football National League.

He gave up Moldovan Citizenship and playing for their national team not to considered Legionnaire in Russian League.

Career statistics

Club

International

References

External links
 
 

1992 births
People from Tiraspol
Footballers from Transnistria
Living people
Moldovan footballers
Association football midfielders
Moldova under-21 international footballers
Moldova international footballers
FC Academia Chișinău players
FC Krasnodar players
FC Krasnodar-2 players
FC Yenisey Krasnoyarsk players
PFC Spartak Nalchik players
FC Anzhi Makhachkala players
FC Tom Tomsk players
FC Baltika Kaliningrad players
FC Rostov players
FC Tambov players
FC Astana players
FC Urozhay Krasnodar players
FC Rubin Kazan players
Moldovan Super Liga players
Russian Premier League players
Russian First League players
Kazakhstan Premier League players
Moldovan expatriate footballers
Expatriate footballers in Russia
Moldovan expatriate sportspeople in Russia
Expatriate footballers in Kazakhstan
Moldovan expatriate sportspeople in Kazakhstan